Alexis Babini is an American Pop recording artist.

Early life
Alexis Babini grew up in Easton, Connecticut, with early music influences including Brazilian bossa nova and The Beatles. He began playing the guitar at the age of 13. He is also known as a native of New York City.

Career
In 2009 he self-released the album Breaking It In. He toured the US in support of the album with artists including Boz Scaggs, Dan Hicks, and Blues Traveler. He played songs from the album live on television as well, including the Comcast Network and BNN TV. Babini's songs have been featured in media including The Real World: D.C. and he himself has been featured as a performer for the Fox Network music section of Xbox Live. In 2011 he released the album Paint and Paper, and performed live on television networks including NBC and a performance in advance of the album release on ABC. He also toured in support of the album, opening for Aaron Carter. In 2013 Babini released the single Shut up and Kiss me as the first single of his new album Pioneer Spirit. Babini is a supporter of Musicians on Call, a charity where musicians sing at local hospitals to sick children. He has described his music as a blend of Folk, Acoustic, and Pop.  In November, 2013, using just an iPhone, Babini created an animated music video for the second single off his debut album, "Jackie". The video was featured shortly after on American Songwriter In 2016,  Alexis was featured as the banjo player on Younger (TV series). His song "Gimme Sunshine" was featured on the TV show Bringing Up Bates.

References

Singers from New York City
American pop guitarists
Year of birth missing (living people)
Living people
People from Easton, Connecticut
Guitarists from New York City
American male guitarists